Theophobos or Theophobus, originally Nasir, Nasr, or Nusayr, was an Iranian commander of the Khurramites who converted to Christianity and entered Byzantine service under Emperor Theophilos (r. 829–843). Raised to high rank and married into the imperial family, Theophobos was given command of his fellow Khurramites and served under Theophilos in his wars against the Abbasid Caliphate in 837–838. After the Byzantines' defeat at the Battle of Anzen, he was proclaimed emperor by his own men, but did not pursue this claim. Instead he peacefully submitted to Theophilos in the next year and was apparently pardoned, until he was executed by the dying emperor in 842 to prevent a challenge to the accession of Michael III.

Biography

Theophobos was born to a family originally belonging to the Iranian aristocracy. He was originally a member of the Khurramite sect in western Iran, which was being persecuted by the Abbasid Caliphate. In October/November 833, they were defeated by the armies of Caliph al-Mu'tasim (r. 833–842) under Ishaq ibn Ibrahim. Thus, in 834, Nasr with some fourteen thousand other Khurramites, crossed the Armenian highland and fled to the Byzantine Empire. There, they converted to Christianity, were given widows from military families as wives, and enrolled into the Byzantine army in the so-called "Persian tourma". Nasr, now baptized Theophobos ("fearful/respectful of God"), was placed at the head of these troops, raised to the rank of patrikios and given the hand of either Theophilos's sister or a sister of Empress Theodora in marriage. The addition of the "Persian" corps greatly strengthened the Byzantine military: not only were its members implacable enemies of the Arabs, but they may have raised the number of effectives in the Byzantine army by as much as a sixth. A seal belonging to Theophobos affords him the style of "exousiastes of the Persians", indicating that Theophilos intended him to install as a ruler of a Byzantine-allied principality, probably in Azerbaijan and Kurdistan.

Already in 837, Theophobos and the new Khurramite corps campaigned with Theophilos in his campaign in the region of the Upper Euphrates around Melitene, where they brutally sacked the city of Zapetra. In September of the same year, some 16,000 more Khurramites fled into the Byzantine Empire, following the final suppression of their movement by the Abbasid army.

Theophobos also participated in the campaign of 838 against al-Mu'tasim's retaliatory invasion. He was present at the catastrophic Byzantine defeat at the Battle of Anzen, where he according to some accounts saved the emperor's life (other accounts credit Manuel the Armenian with the feat). In the aftermath of the battle, however, the "Persian" troops assembled at Sinope and declared Theophobos emperor, most likely against his will. The exact reason behind this move or the exact sequence of events are unclear. However, after the defeat at Anzen, the rumour had spread to Constantinople that Theophilos had been killed, and it appears that Theophobos, who was possibly an iconodule (as opposed to the staunchly iconoclast Theophilos) was suggested by some among the Byzantine Empire's elite as the new emperor.

Despite being proclaimed and crowned—probably according to Sasanian ritual—by his men, Theophobos made no move against Theophilos, and the "Persian" troops remained quiescent at Sinope. Instead, he quickly engaged in secret negotiations with the emperor, who in 839 led an army against the rebels. Theophobos agreed to surrender and was restored to his high offices, while his men, numbering some 30,000, were reportedly split up into regiments of 2000 men and divided among the themata. Theophobos was restored to his previous high position in the army, but this was not to last. Islamic sources report that he died in battle in 839 or 840, but the Byzantine sources contain a different, and more likely, account: in 842, Theophilos, already in declining health and about to die, had Theophobos executed by his brother-in-law Petronas in order to secure the succession of his infant son and heir, Michael III (r. 842–867).

References

Sources

Further reading

842 deaths
9th-century Byzantine people
Converts to Christianity from Zoroastrianism
Byzantine generals
Byzantine usurpers
Patricii
People executed by decapitation
Byzantine people of the Arab–Byzantine wars
Year of birth unknown
9th-century executions by the Byzantine Empire
Khurramites
Byzantine rebels
9th-century Iranian people
Rebels from the Abbasid Caliphate
Byzantine people of Iranian descent